HMS Royal Charles was a 100-gun first-rate ship of the line of the Royal Navy, designed and built by Sir Anthony Deane at Portsmouth Dockyard, where she was launched and completed by his successor as Master Shipwright, Daniel Furzer, in March 1673. She was one of only three Royal Navy ships to be equipped with the Rupertinoe naval gun.

She was Prince Rupert of the Rhine's flagship at the Battles of Schooneveld; two naval battles of the Franco-Dutch War, fought off the coast of the Netherlands on 7 June and 14 June 1673 against the fleet of the United Provinces, commanded by Michiel de Ruyter.

She was rebuilt at Woolwich Dockyard between 1691 and 1693, and renamed HMS Queen on 27 January 1693. The Queen became the flagship of Sir George Rooke and was captained by James Wishart. She was rebuilt for a second time at Woolwich, relaunching on 20 September 1715, and renamed once more, this time as HMS Royal George.

The much-rebuilt Royal George was renamed HMS Royal Anne in 1756, and was broken up in 1767.

Notes

References

Ships of the line of the Royal Navy
1670s ships
Ships built in Woolwich
Ships built in Portsmouth